One Way Mirror may refer to:

One-way mirror
"One Way Mirror" (song), a song by Kinesis